Michael Forney (born May 14, 1988) is an American former professional ice hockey player. He last played with the Belfast Giants in the Elite Ice Hockey League (EIHL). Forney was drafted 80th overall by the Atlanta Thrashers in the 2006 NHL Entry Draft.

Playing career
Forney played in the 2010–11 ECHL All-Star Game. Without an extension offered from his entry level contract with the Winnipeg Jets. Forney returned to the Eagles on a full-time basis, signing a one-year deal on August 16, 2012.

In the 2012–13 season, Forney led the Eagles in scoring, finishing second in the league, with 79 points in 71 games. He was rewarded with a selection to the ECHL First All-Star Team. A free agent, with the intention of keeping in shape, Forney went on a working holiday of sorts, signing a short-term contract with the Perth Thunder of the Australian Ice Hockey League. In only 16 games with the Thunder, Forney scored an impressive 47 points, before leaving in preparation to join his new Austrian club, EC VSV, on a one-year contract for the 2013–14 season.

After a spell with Sheffield Steelers, Forney signed for EIHL counterparts Belfast Giants in 2015. Following two seasons in Northern Ireland, Forney announced his return to his native Minnesota in April 2017.

Career statistics

Awards and honours

References

External links

1988 births
American men's ice hockey left wingers
Atlanta Thrashers draft picks
Arizona Sundogs players
Belfast Giants players
Chicago Wolves players
Colorado Eagles players
Des Moines Buccaneers players
Green Bay Gamblers players
Gwinnett Gladiators players
Ice hockey players from Minnesota
Living people
North Dakota Fighting Hawks men's ice hockey players
People from Thief River Falls, Minnesota
Perth Thunder players
St. John's IceCaps players
Sheffield Steelers players
Sparta Warriors players
Texas Stars players
American expatriate ice hockey players in Canada
American expatriate ice hockey players in Australia
American expatriate ice hockey players in England
American expatriate ice hockey players in Northern Ireland
American expatriate ice hockey players in Austria
American expatriate ice hockey players in Norway